The 11th Hong Kong Awards ceremony, honored the best films of 1991 and took place on 5 April 1992 at Hong Kong Academy for Performing Arts, Wan Chai, Hong Kong. The ceremony was hosted by Philip Chan and Lawrence Cheng, during the ceremony awards are presented in 15 categories.

Awards
Winners are listed first, highlighted in boldface, and indicated with a double dagger.

References

External links
Official website of the Hong Kong Film Awards

1992
1991 film awards
1992 in Hong Kong